Julie Mukoda Zabwe is a Ugandan ICT Expert and politician who has also been the Mayuge District woman representative a position she has held since 2016.

Background and education 
She was born on 2 January 1980. Julie Mukoda attended Mengo Senior School and Mbogo High School for O level in 1996 and A level in 1998 respectively for her high school education. She studied Computer Science at Makerere University graduating with Bachelor of Computer Science in 2005.  She went on to obtained Master of Public Administration from Uganda Management Institute, in Kampala in 2016–2018. In 2014.

Work experience 

Between 2007 and 2008 she worked as an Academic Registrar at Bethel Training Institute, Assistant Systems Administrator at TASO, Jinja in 2002–2004, Network Administrator at MXN Technologies in 2006–2007 she is the Director at United Helping Hands for Uganda from 2007 to date, Patron at Core Foundation 2012 to date, she is also Mayuge District woman representative a position she has held since 2016 to date.

Following the February 2016 general election, Julie Mukoda was unanimously elected as Mayuge District woman representative on 2016.

Parliamentary duties 
Besides her duties as speaker of the Ugandan Parliament, she sits on the following parliamentary committees:

 The Parliamentary Commission – She was a member
 COMMITTEE ON PUBLIC SERVICE AND LOCAL GOVERNMENT – Member

References

1980 births
Makerere University alumni
Uganda Management Institute alumni
Members of the Parliament of Uganda
Women members of the Parliament of Uganda
Living people